The 2008 World Figure Skating Championships was a senior international figure skating competition in the 2007–08 figure skating season. Medals were awarded in the disciplines of men's singles, ladies' singles, pair skating, and ice dancing. The event was held at the Scandinavium arena in Gothenburg, Sweden from March 16 to 23.

Qualification

The competition was open to skaters from ISU member nations who had reached the age of 15 by July 1, 2007. The corresponding competition for younger skaters was the 2008 World Junior Championships.

Based on the results of the 2007 World Championships, each country was allowed between one and three entries per discipline. National associations selected their entries based on their own criteria.

Due to the large number of entries at the World Championships, only the top 24 single skaters and top 20 pairs advanced to the free skating after the short program. In ice dancing, the top 30 couples in the compulsory dance advanced to the original dance, and the top 24 couples after the original dance advanced to the free dance.

Medals summary

Medalists

Medals by country

Competition notes
The compulsory dance was the Argentine Tango.

Dan Zhang / Hao Zhang from China set a new world record of 74.36 points under the ISU Judging System for pairs' short program.

European champion ice dancers Oksana Domnina / Maxim Shabalin (RUS) withdrew before the event due to an injury to his knee. They were replaced by Ekaterina Bobrova / Dmitri Soloviev. Four Continents and Grand Prix Final bronze medalist Evan Lysacek withdrew before the event due to injury. He was replaced by US pewter medalist Jeremy Abbott.

Results

Men

Jeffrey Buttle was the sixth Canadian man to win the world title. His win set off a controversy because he did not attempt a quadruple jump. Brian Joubert the silver medalist criticized the system for producing a winner who did not complete or attempt a quadruple jump. This set off the first of many debates on the value of the quads and what men's figure skating should be about that would culminate in the 2010 Olympic Quadruple jump controversy.

Ladies

Carolina Kostner led the short program with 64.28 points, just 0.18 points higher than Mao Asada who was in second. Kim Yuna fell on her triple Lutz, leaving her in fifth place after the short program. Despite popping a triple lutz at the end of her program and saving multiple jump landings, Kim earned the top free skate score of 123.38 points. Kostner received negative grade of execution on five of her seven jumping passes but still managed the third highest free score. Asada, one of two women attempting the triple Axel in the competition, fell during the takeoff of the axel, but still managed to do two triple-triples and score 1.46 points higher than Kostner, securing the gold medal. Silver went to Kostner and Kim received the bronze medal.

Pairs

Ice dancing

Multiple spots for 2009 Worlds
The following countries have earned more than one entry to the 2009 World Championships based on performance at the 2008 World Championships.

References

External links

 Competitors list
 Entries and results
  
  
  
 

World Figure Skating Championships
World Championships
World Figure Skating Championships
World Championships
International figure skating competitions hosted by Sweden
2000s in Gothenburg
March 2008 sports events in Europe
International sports competitions in Gothenburg